Music Teachers National Association (MTNA) is an American nonprofit professional organization for the support, growth, and development of music-teaching professionals, with more than 17,000 members in 50 states, and more than 500 affiliated local and state organizations. MTNA offers a wide range of member resources, from leadership, teaching and personal health support, to insurance, financial and legal services. It also comprises two subsidiaries, the MTNA Professional Certification Program, and the MTNA Foundation Fund, which supports a variety of programs that include music competitions and commissioning of composers. MTNA was founded in 1876, and is registered as a 501(c)(3) organization in Ohio, with headquarters located in Cincinnati.

History
Music Teachers National Association is an American organization founded in 1876 by Theodore Presser, who was both a musician and publisher. MTNA is credited in helping to establish an international pitch scale in 1883 as well as promoting international copyright law and giving official recognition to the American composer. In 1967, MTNA approved the program for qualified teachers. MTNA is also known for commissioning compositions by American composers and presenting the annual Distinguished Composer of the Year Award. The association also holds annual competitions for young musicians at the local, state, and national level. Currently, the organization has approximately 17,000 members, including teachers, performers, and composers, and more than 500 affiliated local and state organizations.

MTNA's purpose is to advance the benefit of studying music and music making to society and to support the professionalism of music teachers. MTNA maintains two subsidiary programs: MTNA Professional Certification Program and the MTNA Foundation Fund. The Professional Certification Program exists to improve the quality of professionalism in applied music teaching and assists the public in identifying proficient music teachers in their communities. The MTNA Foundation Fund supports programs that financially assist teachers and students with educational objectives while supplying an opportunity for individual and corporate support of MTNA and its programs.

Awards and Special Programs

As an association of music teachers, MTNA's mission is to elevate the professional level and develop the standing of all its members. MTNA is responsible for disseminating many publications, including books, journals, and pamphlets that have greatly impacted the profession of teaching music. MTNA also perpetually seeks newly published music and other teaching materials to raise awareness among its members.

The Certification of Teachers 

According to MTNA, "The National Certification Plan is one of the highest importance to the professional welfare of the music teacher, and it provides a means of measuring and recognizing his or her professional growth. It represents almost a century of consultation and deliberation on the part of America's musical leaders."

MTNA Forums

The independent music teachers forum of MTNA was the first established in 1972, at the MTNA Convention in Portland, Oregon. After this initial meeting, IMTF organized different committees on the local and state levels. Its purpose was "To investigate the role of the full time independent teacher in American society today: the problems, advantages, and practices of this group, with the goal of establishing a true profession in this decade."

Multiple forums now exist through MTNA. They provide an environment for open discussion and the expression of ideas. These forums meet annually at the MTNA conference. These forums include:

Arts Awareness & Advocacy
Collaborative Performance
College Faculty
Collegiate Chapters
Independent Teachers
Local Associations
Wellness

"Distinguished Composer of the Year" Award

First awarded in 1969, the terms of the Distinguished Composer of the Year Award state that an MTNA-affiliated state music teachers association could commission any composer of their choice to compose a work for their state convention. Recording and scores of these works could then be sent to the national headquarters in Cincinnati. From these commissions, one composer is selected each year by a panel of judges to receive the "Distinguished Composer Award," otherwise known as the "Composer of the Year" award.

Previous winners include:

 Delvyn Case (2021)
Peter Van Zandt Lane (2020)
 Bret Bohman (2019) 
 Benjamin Krause (2018)
 Philip Schuessler (2017)
 David Gompper (2016)
 David von Kampen (2015)
 Christos Tsitsaros (2014)
 Michael-Thomas Foumai (2013)
Thomas Osborne (2012)
M. Shawn Hundley (2011)
Seth Custer (2010)
Pierre Jalbert (2009)
William Price (2008)
John McDonald (2007)
David Froom (2006)
Michael Djupstrom (2005)
Stefan Freund (2004)
Liduino Pitombeira (2003)
Timothy Hoekman (2002)
David Mullikin (2001)
Elisenda Fábregas (2000)
Laurence Bitensky (1999)
Erik Santos (1998)

National Conference

The MTNA National Conference, which is held annually, brings together the constituents of the MTNA membership. National competitions highlights the performances of students in all instrument areas, including composition. The national conferences also include master classes, technology and informational sessions, pedagogy sessions, and evening concerts. Members have the opportunity to participate in the national conference by submitting proposals and papers for presentation.

MTNA National Conferences

MTNA Presidents

Divisions

During the Chicago convention of 1948, the MTNA Executive Committee established the divisional organizations. Each state was assigned to a particular division, even though the state in question, at the time, may not have had an organized chapter of the MTNA. The Current Divisions are as follows:

East Central Division

Illinois
Indiana
Michigan
Ohio
Wisconsin

Eastern Division

Connecticut
Delaware
District of Columbia
Maryland
Massachusetts
New Hampshire
New Jersey
New York
Pennsylvania
Rhode Island
Vermont
West Virginia

Northwest Division
Alaska
Idaho
Montana
Oregon
Washington
Wyoming

South Central Division

Arkansas
Louisiana
Oklahoma
Texas

Southern Division

Alabama
Florida 
Georgia
Kentucky
Mississippi
North Carolina
South Carolina 
Tennessee
Virginia

Southwest Division

Arizona
California
Hawaii
Nevada
New Mexico
Utah

West Central Division

Colorado
Iowa
Kansas
Minnesota
Missouri
Nebraska
North Dakota
South Dakota

State Associations

All fifty states and the District of Columbia have affiliations with MTNA. Forty-nine state (forty-eight states, and the District of Columbia) music teachers associations were established between 1876 and 1969. The final two states to be established were Maine in 1976 and Alaska in 1982.

State Affiliates

References

External links
Official MTNA web site
Official MTNA Certification web site

Music education organizations
Music organizations based in the United States
Arts organizations based in Ohio
Organizations based in Cincinnati
Organizations established in 1876
1876 establishments in the United States